Rhenium hexafluoride, also rhenium(VI) fluoride, (ReF6) is a compound of rhenium and fluorine and one of the seventeen known binary hexafluorides.

Synthesis 
Rhenium hexafluoride is made by combining rhenium heptafluoride with additional rhenium metal at 300 °C in a pressure vessel.

6  + Re → 7

Description 
Rhenium hexafluoride is a liquid at room temperature.  At 18.5 °C, it freezes into a yellow solid.  The boiling point is 33.7 °C.

The solid structure measured at −140 °C is orthorhombic space group Pnma.  Lattice parameters are a = 9.417 Å, b = 8.570 Å, and c = 4.965 Å.  There are four formula units (in this case, discrete molecules) per unit cell, giving a density of 4.94 g·cm−3.

The ReF6 molecule itself (the form important for the liquid or gas phase) has octahedral molecular geometry, which has point group (Oh).  The Re–F bond length is 1.823 Å.

Use 
Rhenium hexafluoride is a commercial material used in the electronics industry for depositing films of rhenium.

References

Further reading 
 Gmelins Handbuch der anorganischen Chemie, System Nr. 70, Rhenium, Part A, pp. 102–105.

External links 
 Rhenium hexafluoride at webelements.com.

Rhenium compounds
Hexafluorides
Octahedral compounds